Bandixon is a district of Surxondaryo Region in Uzbekistan. The administrative center of the district is located at the town of Bandixon. The district was first established in 1992, and it was abolished and merged into Qiziriq District in 2010. It was re-established in 2019 from part of the Qiziriq and Boysun Districts.

References

Districts of Uzbekistan
Surxondaryo Region